Mundaya Balembo is a DR Congolese former footballer. She has been a member of the DR Congo women's national team.

International career
Mundaya was capped for the DR Congo at senior level during two Africa Women Cup of Nations qualifications (2002 and 2006).

International goals
Scores and results list DR Congo's goal tally first

See also
 List of Democratic Republic of the Congo women's international footballers

References

Living people
Democratic Republic of the Congo women's footballers
Democratic Republic of the Congo women's international footballers
Year of birth missing (living people)
Women's association footballers not categorized by position